Center for Strategic Research refers to the following organisations:

 Center for Strategic Research (Iran), a former think tank based in Tehran
 Center for Strategic Research (Russia), a think tank based in Moscow

See also
 Center for Strategic Studies (disambiguation)